Olamaboro is a Local Government Area in the southeast of Kogi State, Nigeria, bordering Enugu State and Benue State. Its headquarters are in the town of Okpo.
 
It has an area of 1,132 km and a population of 160,152 at the 2006 census.

The postal code of the area is 270.

Climate
In the town of Okpo, the rainy season is warm, oppressive, and overcast and the dry season is hot, muggy, and partly cloudy. Over the course of the year, the temperature typically varies from 61 °F to 88 °F and is rarely below 55 °F or above 93 °F.

References

Local Government Areas in Kogi State